Tommy Enström (born July 30, 1986, in Nordingrå) is a Swedish professional ice hockey player, currently playing with Modo Hockey in the HockeyAllsvenskan (Allsv). Enström returned to his original club, Modo, after 10 seasons and upon the club's relegation to the HockeyAllsvenskan on May 24, 2016. He is a younger brother to veteran NHL defenseman, Tobias Enström.

References

External links

1986 births
Frisk Asker Ishockey players
IF Sundsvall Hockey players
Leksands IF players
Living people
Modo Hockey players
Rögle BK players
Swedish ice hockey defencemen
Swedish ice hockey forwards
Tingsryds AIF players